Carus Thompson is an Australian singer-songwriter from Perth, Western Australia. From 1995 to 2008, he performed under the title Carus and The True Believers before going solo the group disbanded. Thompson has released four studio albums, Creatures of Habit (2009), Caravan (2011), Island (February 2017) and Shakespeare Avenue (October 2019).

History

1995–2008: Carus and The True Believers 
In 1995, 18-year-old Carus Thompson formed Carus and The True Believers. They began performing on the local pub circuit, often for four or five nights a week. Thompson lists Paul Kelly as one of his early influences. 
The group supported local performances by Australian artists, Mick Thomas (of Weddings Parties Anything), Ed Kuepper and Neil Murray.

In 2000 Carus and the True Believers released their self-titled first extended play. In 2002, they released their second EPMind's Eye and began touring interstate.

In December 2002, Carus and the True Believers, with the line-up of Thompson, Paul Keenan on drums and Noel Manyam on bass guitar, recorded their debut studio album, Songs from Martin St., in Melbourne's Martin Street Studios. It was released in February 2003, which Thompson co-produced with his brother, Christian Thompson, and includes guest performances by Vikki Simpson (of the Waifs) on vocals and John Butler (of the John Butler Trio) on guitar. It has an eclectic mix of rock, reggae and folk styling, which reached number 18 on the Australian Independent Records chart. The group relocated to Melbourne. Paul Keenen left and Thompson recruited Jason McGann on drums. The album established the trio in the new roots-folk scene, they followed with a national tour and then a tour of Europe.

Thompson gave a solo performance at Fremantle's Norfolk Hotel, which was recorded by engineer James Hewgill (worked for the Waifs), and was released as a double live album, Acoustic at the Norfolk, in October 2003. It has Thompson either solo on lead vocals and acoustic guitar or accompanied by Adam Gare on violin and Dave Johnson on harmonies and mandolin.

In April 2004, Long Nights are Gone, the second studio album by Carus and the True Believers was recorded in one day in Fremantle with half the songs written and recorded on the same day.

In 2005, Carus and the True Believers released a five-track EP, Breakdown (2005). The line-up joining Thompson, Johnston and Gare were Ben Franz on bass guitar and Howle Johnstone on drums and percussion,. In May 2007, the band released their third studio album, Three Boxes and disbanded in 2008.

2008–present: Solo 
Thompson released his debut solo album, Creature of Habit, in March 2009, and followed with Caravan in 2011.

His third solo album Island was released in February 2017. Tex Miller of Forté magazine rated it at four-and-a-half out of five and explained, "Brilliant riffs, honest heartfelt lyrics and an element that is sure to have you singing along with a smile in no time."

Discography

Studio albums

Live albums

Extended plays

Awards

AIR Awards
The Australian Independent Record Awards (commonly known informally as AIR Awards) is an annual awards night to recognise, promote and celebrate the success of Australia's Independent Music sector.

|-
| AIR Awards of 2009
|Creature of Habit 
| Best Independent Blues and Roots Album
| 
|-

WAM Song of the Year
The WAM Song of the Year was formed by the  Western Australian Rock Music Industry Association Inc. (WARMIA) in 1985, with its main aim to develop and run annual awards recognising achievements within the music industry in Western Australia.

 (wins only)
|-
| 2017/18
| "Lies"
| Blues / Roots Song of the Year
| 
|-

References 

Living people
21st-century Australian singers
21st-century Australian male singers
Western Australian musical groups
Musical groups established in 1995
Musical groups disestablished in 2008
Australian folk music groups
Year of birth missing (living people)